MicroSIP is a portable SIP softphone based on the PJSIP stack available for Microsoft Windows. It facilitates high quality VoIP calls (p2p or on regular telephones) based on the open SIP protocol.

MicroSIP falls into the free and open source software category and is being released under the GNU GPL-2.0-or-later.

It relies on the PJSIP stack and draws on available features. 

This software's distinguishing characteristics are:
 Profile of a lightweight background application
 Small memory footprint (less than 20 MB RAM usage)
 Strong adherence to the SIP standard
 Support for a number of codecs: Opus, SILK, G.722, G.729, G.723.1, G.711, Speex, iLBC, GSM, AMR, AMR-WB, and video codecs H.264, H.263+, VP8.
 STUN and ICE NAT traversal
 SIP SIMPLE presence and messaging

There are two variants, a full version with video and a "Lite" version for voice and messaging only.

See also

 Comparison of VoIP software
 List of SIP software

References

External links
Official website
PJSIP official website
MicroSIP Softphone Review at About.com
reviews from portablefreeware community
reviews from wilderssecurity community
MDev Group website

Free VoIP software
Windows multimedia software